The Xmas EP is a holiday EP recorded by Never Shout Never, featuring three covers of Christmas songs, including Winter Wonderland and songs by John Lennon/Yoko Ono and John Prine, as well as an original song featuring Dia Frampton.

Track list

References

2013 EPs
Never Shout Never albums
Warner Records EPs
Covers EPs